The healthy user bias or healthy worker bias is a bias that can damage the validity of epidemiologic studies testing the efficacy of particular therapies or interventions. 

Specifically, it is a sampling bias or selection bias: the kind of subjects that take up an intervention, including by enrolling in a clinical trial, are not representative of the general population. People who volunteer for a study can be expected, on average, to be healthier than people who don't volunteer, as they are concerned for their health and are predisposed to follow medical advice, both factors that would aid one's health. In a sense, being healthy or active about one's health is a precondition for becoming a subject of the study, an effect that can appear under other conditions such as studying particular groups of workers.  For example, someone in ill health is unlikely to have a job as manual laborer.  As a result, studies of manual laborers are studies of people who are currently healthy enough to engage in manual labor, rather than studies of people who would do manual labor if they were healthy enough.

References

Further reading

External links 
  "Do We Really Know What Makes Us Healthy?"

Epidemiology
Bias
Medical statistics
Sampling (statistics)